is a 2002 cover album by GO!GO!7188. The name translates in English as Tiger's Lair. The album's cover art is similar to Revolver by The Beatles.

Track listing
 Yōkai Ningen Bem (妖怪人間ベム) - from the anime of the same name
 Koi no Dorei (恋の奴隷) - Slave to Love - Chiyo Okumura cover
 Hitonatsu no Keiken (ひと夏の経験) - An Experience of One Summer - Momoe Yamaguchi cover
 Cutie Honey (キューティーハニー) - Cutie Honey OP cover
 Ban Ban Ban (バンバンバン) - The Spiders cover
 Pepper Keibu (ペッパー警部) - Inspector Pepper - Pink Lady cover
 Kimi dake ni Ai o (君だけに愛を) - Love for Only You - The Tigers cover
 Kokoro no Tabi (心の旅) - Heart's Journey - Tulip cover

2002 albums
GO!GO!7188 albums